The Great Britain Wightman Cup team was the less successful team in the Wightman Cup tennis competition. The team won 10 titles out of 61 participations.

History
Great Britain won their first Wightman Cup in 1924. They won 10 out of 61 titles, only retaining the cup on two occasions; from 1924 to 1925 and from 1974 to 1975. Great Britain won its last Wightman Cup in 1978. In 1989, after eleven straight defeats, the Wightman Cup was wound up.

Members of the inaugural team
 Geraldine Beamish
 Mabel Clayton
 Phyllis Covell
 Kathleen McKane

Members of the last team
 Jo Durie
 Sara Gomer
 Anne Hobbs
 Clare Wood

See also
Wightman Cup
Great Britain Fed Cup team
Great Britain Davis Cup team

Wightman Cup
Great Britain team